The Tobacco Lords  were a group of Scottish merchants who in the 18th century made enormous fortunes by trading in tobacco which was supported by the slave trade. Many became so wealthy that they adopted the lifestyle of aristocrats, lavishing vast sums on great houses and splendid churches.

History

In 1707, the Treaty of Union between Scotland and England gave Scottish merchants access to the English colonies, especially in North America. Glasgow's position on the River Clyde, where the westerlies hit Europe as well as in other places like Bristol, Nantes, or Bordeaux, may have been an opportunity for its merchants. The French monarchy granted to Glasgow in 1747 a monopoly for the importation of tobacco into French territories.  The deepening of the Clyde in 1768 provided a further advantage, because Glasgow ships were built specifically for the Atlantic crossing and were generally bigger than those of other ports.

The tobacco trade was part of broader trade that linked exports of consumer and manufactured goods from Europe with the North American and Caribbean colonies. Operated on plantation economies fueled by slave labour, these colonies supplied products that found a ready market in Europe. The triangle involved merchants carrying manufactured goods from Europe to West Africa to sell or exchange for slaves which they transported on to America and the Caribbean. On the third leg back to Europe they carried tobacco, rum, cotton, sugar and the like.

From 1710, Glasgow became the centre of an economic boom which lasted nearly fifty years. The Tobacco Lords personified this boom and were the nouveau riche of the mid-eighteenth century. Arguably the most successful of these merchants was John Glassford, who entered the tobacco trade in 1750 and had soon acquired a fleet of vessels and many tobacco stores across New England. Celebrated in his lifetime, Glassford was the most extensive ship owner of his generation in Scotland, and one of the four merchants who laid the foundation of the commercial greatness of Glasgow through the tobacco trade. Tobias Smollett wrote of a meeting with Glassford in 1771:

Palaces and churches

Glasgow merchants made such fortunes that they adopted the style of aristocrats in their superior manner and in their lavish homes and churches. The merchants' Calvinist background made sure, however, that display was always of rich but sober materials – black silk clothes, (though startlingly set off by scarlet cloaks), black three-cornered hats, silver- (or even gold-) tipped ebony canes, mahogany furniture, and classical architecture in their domestic and public use. Their mansions were laid out on the western boundaries of the 18th century city, where they gave their names to later streets in what modern Glasgow now calls the Merchant City. Other streets recall the triangular trade more directly, with modern streets bearing names like Virginia Street and Jamaica Street. Among the important Tobacco Lords whose mansions gave their names to streets were Andrew Buchanan, James Dunlop, Archibald Ingram, James Wilson, Alexander Oswald, Andrew Cochrane, and John Glassford. The Virginia Mansion of Alexander Speirs gave Virginia Street its name, and Alexander gave his surname to Speirs Wharf in Port Dundas.

Some idea of the grandeur of the Tobacco Lords' houses - which often dramatically punctuated the ends of the streets named after them – can be had in the original core of Glasgow.  The Gallery of Modern Art, which today occupies the (greatly expanded and embellished by later reconstruction as the Exchange) mansion built for William Cunninghame in 1780, at a cost of £10,000 (equivalent to £ in ). A more modest Tobacco Merchant's House (by James Craig, 1775) is being restored at 42 Miller Street.

St Andrew’s Parish Church in St Andrew’s Square, built 1739–1756 by Alan Dreghorn was the Tobacco Lord's ostentatious parish church, in a prestigious area being laid out by such merchants as David Dale (who was not involved in the tobacco trade). In the same area was the grand house of Alexander Speirs.

St Andrew's in the Square still survives today and is considered one of the finest classical churches in Britain, Today it is Glasgow's Centre for Scottish Culture, promoting Scottish music, song and dance. The church is located in St Andrew's Square, near Glasgow Cross and Glasgow Green, on the edge of the City's East End. The church, inspired by St Martin-in-the-Fields in London, was built between 1739 and 1756 by Master Mason Mungo Naismith. It was the first Presbyterian church built after the Reformation, and was commissioned by the city's Tobacco Lords as a demonstration of their wealth and power.

American Revolution
During the 1760s tensions grew between Britain and her American colonies, amongst which were economic stresses arising out of the perceived unfairness of the tobacco trade. The market in tobacco was dominated by the Glasgow merchants who manipulated prices (as the colonists claimed) and caused great distress among Maryland and Virginia planters, who by the time of the outbreak of war had accumulated debts of around £1 million, a huge sum at the time (equivalent to £ in ). These debts, as much as the taxation imposed by Westminster, were among the colonists' most bitter grievances. It was this extension of cheap credit that made the Glasgow men different. The English merchants simply sold American tobacco in Europe and took a commission. The Scots bought the crop at pre-arranged prices, and made large (and potentially risky) loans to their customers.

Prior to 1740, Glasgow merchants were responsible for the import of less than 10% of America's tobacco crop, but by the 1750s Glasgow handled more of the trade than the rest of Britain's ports combined. Heavily capitalised, and taking great personal risks, these men made immense fortunes from the "Clockwork Operation" of fast ships coupled with ruthless dealmaking and the manipulation of credit. Maryland and Virginia planters were offered easy credit by the Glaswegian merchants, enabling them to buy European consumer goods and other luxuries before harvest time gave them the ready cash to do so. But when the time came to sell the crop, the indebted growers found themselves forced by the traders to accept low prices for their harvest in order to stave off bankruptcy. At his Mount Vernon plantation, future President of the United States George Washington saw his liabilities swell to nearly £2,000 by the late 1760s (equivalent to £ in ). Thomas Jefferson, on the verge of losing his own farm, accused British merchants of unfairly depressing tobacco prices and forcing Virginia farmers to take on unsustainable debt loads. In 1786, he remarked:A powerful engine for this [mercantile profiteering] was the giving of good prices and credit to the planter till they got him more immersed in debt than he could pay without selling lands or slaves. They then reduced the prices given for his tobacco so that…they never permitted him to clear off his debt.

After the war, few of the enormous debts owed by the colonists would ever be repaid. Despite these setbacks, after the American War of Independence (1775–1783) the Glasgow merchants switched their attention to other profitable parts of the triangular trade, particularly cotton in the British West Indies.

Legacy
The impact of the Tobacco Lords on Glasgow's architectural heritage remains today. St Andrew's in the Square is today Glasgow's Centre for Scottish Culture, promoting Scottish music, song and dance. William Cunninghame's (greatly expanded and embellished) mansion now houses the Glasgow Gallery of Modern Art.

Notable Tobacco Lords
George Bogle of Daldowie
Andrew Buchanan of Drumpellier
Andrew Cochrane of Brighouse
Andrew Caskie of Kilcreggan
William Cunninghame
James Dunlop
John Glassford
 Archibald Ingram
Logan Lowe of Aberdeen
Alexander Oswald
Alexander Speirs

See also
History of Maryland in the American Revolution
Fur Barons of Montreal

References
Devine, Tom The Tobacco Lords: A Study of the Tobacco Merchants of Glasgow and their Trading Activities, 1740-1790 (John Donald, 1975)
Oliver, Neil, A History of Scotland, Phoenix, Orion Books, London (2009)

Notes

18th century in Scotland
Economy of Glasgow
History of Glasgow
Tobacco in the United Kingdom
Wealth in Scotland
Industrial Revolution in Scotland
History of tobacco
Trade in Scotland